Frank Wyndham Goldie (5 July 1897 – 26 September 1957) was an English actor.

World War I
During World War I, Goldie was a lieutenant in the Royal Marine Light Infantry. His elder brother Maurice also held a commission in the same Corps during the war.

Acting career
Goldie came to prominence as an actor at the Liverpool Playhouse from 1927 until summer 1934, the last year during which he also directed plays. In 1937 he starred in Margaret Kennedy's play Autumn in the West End.

Personal life
He was married to the television producer Grace Wyndham Goldie.

Partial filmography
 Lorna Doone (1934) as Chief Judge Jeffries (London)
 Man of the Moment (1935) as Jason Randall
 Crime Unlimited (1935) as Conway Addison
 The Black Mask (1935) as Davidson
 Under the Red Robe (1937) as Edmond, Duke of Fiox
 Victoria the Great (1937) as Cecil Rhodes
 The Last Chance (1937) as John Worrall
 The Return of Carol Deane (1938) as Francis Scott-Vaughan
 Sixty Glorious Years (1938) as Arthur J. Balfour
 Old Bones of the River (1938) as Commissioner Sanders
 Inspector Hornleigh on Holiday (1939) as Sir George Winbeck
 The Arsenal Stadium Mystery (1939) as Kindilett
 Girl in the News (1940) as Edward Bentley
 Night Train to Munich (1940) as Charles Dryton
 Seven Days to Noon (1950) as Rev. Burgess
 Doctor in the House (1954) as Examiner (uncredited)
 Child's Play (1954) as Director Atomic Research
 The Secret (1955) as Doctor Scott
 Brothers in Law (1957) as Mr. Smith
 The Strange World of Planet X (1958) as Brigadier Cartwright (final film role)

References

Bibliography
 Low, Rachael. History of the British Film: Filmmaking in 1930s Britain. George Allen & Unwin, 1985 .

External links

1897 births
1957 deaths
English male film actors
English male stage actors
Male actors from Kent
20th-century English male actors
Royal Marines personnel of World War I
Military personnel from Kent
Royal Marines officers